Three ships of the Royal Navy have borne the name HMS Skylark:

  was 16-gun brig-sloop of the 
  was a 10-gun 
  was a minelaying tender launched in 1932 and renamed HMS Vernon in 1938 and HMS Vesuvius in 1941

Royal Navy ship names